Sevanaia Koroi is a professional rugby league footballer. He represented Fiji at the 2008 Rugby League World Cup.  Koroi signed with the British side Barrow Raiders for 2009, but the deal was cancelled due to the player being unable to obtain a visa.

References

External links
Fiji v France: Teams

Living people
Expatriate rugby league players in England
Fiji national rugby league team players
Fijian expatriate rugby league players
Fijian expatriate sportspeople in England
Fijian rugby league players
I-Taukei Fijian people
Rugby league centres
Rugby league second-rows
Year of birth missing (living people)